Nahr-e Tolayeb (also Romanized as Nahr-e Tolayeb and Nahr-e Ţalayeb) is a village in Nasar Rural District, Arvandkenar District, Abadan County, Khuzestan Province, Iran. At the 2006 census, its population was 230, in 43 families.

References 

Populated places in Abadan County